Edward Cross may refer to:
Edward Cross (politician) (1798–1887), Democratic member of the United States House of Representatives from the state of Arkansas
Edward E. Cross (1832–1863), newspaperman and Union Army general during the American Civil War
Edward Cross (zoo proprietor) (1774–1854), English zoo proprietor and dealer in animals
Edward Cross (footballer), English footballer who played for Sheffield United
Edward Makin Cross (1880–1965), bishop of Spokane in the Episcopal Church